Haines City Senior High School (HCHS) is a public high school in Haines City, Florida. The school has existed in three separate locations.

Overview
Haines City Senior High School belongs to the Polk County School Board and is a member of Polk District Schools. Haines City High School was the original high school in the city, opening in 1922. During the 2005-2006 school year, there was a tuberculosis scare due to one of the students being diagnosed.

History

The first settlers arrived in Haines City in 1881. Two years later, they built the first school on East Hinson Avenue where the former City Hall building was located. The two-story wooden structure had a school enrollment of nine students. In 1918, a yellow brick elementary school for grades one through eight was built. Any student wishing a high school education had to attend classes in Lakeland, located 25 miles away from Haines City.  Clay Cut was the original name of this quaint little town.  In 1883, when trains would pass through this Central Florida area, they were lost from sight because of the railroad tracks that were built so deep in the clay. Later, when an officer with the South Florida Railroad named Colonel Henry Haines brought about the building of the town's train station, he was honored with the city being named after him. Thus, Haines City was born.

In 1916, the first citrus processing plant in the United States was built in Haines City and made the city all that it is today. The city lived and died with the successes and failures of this processing plant. The town experienced a mighty growth in population through these years until the mid-1890s. Haines City suffered immensely from severe freezes on the citrus crop and the city was almost destroyed by a fire. 
The citrus industry eventually recovered from the devastation, and in the 1920s, Haines City profited from a large population boost. As a result the community was incorporated, the city limits were expanded and many residential and commercial buildings were erected.

The first serving grades one through twelve was built in 1922-23 on Ledwith Avenue where the city tennis court facility is now located.  A new school, called Central Elementary, was built in 1925-26 across the street, and it was here in 1926 that Haines City's first high school graduation ceremony took place. 
A new high school was built next to Central Elementary on Ledwith Avenue in 1949. It received national recognition in an architectural periodical for its innovative design. When it opened, it housed grade seven through twelve, but was later changed to grades ten through twelve and three additions were added to the school. With continued enrollment demands,  the school was forced to seek a new location which could accommodate the rapidly growing area around the community.

In 1977, the school moved to a new location on Grace Avenue. In the past twenty years  since moving, the high school has added a gymnasium, a new agricultural and industrial arts complex, a  new science building in 1990 and a new social studies wing in 1991. In addition, the old football facility at Yale field, owned by the city of Haines City, was renamed in honor of former longtime coach Joseph  Stangry  and relocated to the new campus. Since that time, track and field facilities, baseball, softball, and soccer fields have been constructed. The school recently purchased land north of the school complex to house additions to the agricultural program and develop a Land Lab.  The school also experienced massive growth when the ninth grade was added to the campus from Haines City Junior High School, adding approximately twenty percent to the enrollment figures.  In 1992, the Student Council petitioned the city of Haines City to name the portion of Grace Avenue adjacent to the school after its mascot, The Hornets. The City Commission unanimously approved the request, renaming the street to Hornet Drive.

International Baccalaureate East
In the 2007-2008 school year, an International Baccalaureate Diploma Program was approved by the IBO. To enter the program, students from the east side of Polk County are required to take a qualification test in eighth grade, and about 150 students are accepted every year into the 9th grade of the program. A new grade was added to the school every year from 2006 through 2009, starting with 9th and adding the subsequent grade each year until all grades 9-12 became offered, which became reality starting with the 2009-10 school year. The first graduating class was thus the class of 2010, and seven graduating classes have now completed the IB program at Haines City, with its eighth preparing to graduate in 2017. The IB program does not technically begin until the students' junior year; the school offers a Pre-IB program for freshman and sophomore students to prepare them for the rigors of the latter two years. The assistant principal and IB coordinator is Crystal Young.  Haines City IB also goes by International Baccalaureate East, distinguishing itself from its intracounty IB rival at Bartow High School.

Fire
On Friday May 17, 2013, Haines City High School experienced a small fire in the freshman academy building. The fire started around fourth period (9:50 am – 11:30 am). The fire started around 11 am that morning. The fire, which happened in the first floor boys' restroom, was caused by a hand-dryer malfunction. The freshman building was evacuated immediately. A Staff member got on the intercom and said, "(radio feedback) Attention all students in the 9th grade building, evacuate immediately. This is not a drill," only seconds before the fire alarm went off. Students obeyed, and went out to their normal fire safety areas, before being pushed back even further. All students in the school were evacuated because of the fire alarm. When they figured out the only danger was in the 9th grade building other students went back in and continued classes. Students waited as fire and police came to help. Students were then moved to the courtyard. They sat in the sun for 2 hours before the school day ended.

School songs
The school's fight song is an arrangement of "Our Director March" by Frederick Bigelow with school-specific lyrics.

Notable alumni 
Arthur Blake - Olympian hurdler
Wayne Gandy - former NFL player
Derrick Gibson - Former MLB player (Colorado Rockies)
Marshall Holloway - physicist
Derwin James - NFL player
Larry Parrish - Former MLB player (Montreal Expos, Texas Rangers, Boston Red Sox)
Jah Reid - former NFL player
Sevyn Streeter - R&B Singer
Norris - Delivery Driver
Rachel Starr - Actress
Carlos Coy - Jazz Musician

References

External links 
Haines City High School
Haines City IB Website 

High schools in Polk County, Florida
Haines City, Florida
Public high schools in Florida
Educational institutions established in 1922
1922 establishments in Florida